Zhytsen or Žycień is a positive creature from Belarusian mythology said to live in fields.

Description

In Belarus, Zhyten is described as a little old man with a beard. A distinctive feature of Zhytsen is the third eye in the back of its head, which is needed to complete its tasks more efficiently.

Mode of life

Zhyten is often called a spirit of wealth and wellbeing. It is believed that Zhytsen contributes to good ripening of crops and vegetables, and accordingly, Zhyten is considered the caretaker of good harvests.

Zhytsen walks through the fields and ensures that crops there are well reaped. It is believed in Belarusian folklore that if Zhytsen finds some left ears of grain, it binds them in sheaves and brings to the fields of more diligent farmers.

See also
 Damavik
 Dzedka
 Lazavik
 Shatans
 Younik
 Zheuzhyk
 Zlydzens

References

Belarusian folklore
Slavic legendary creatures
Slavic tutelary deities